Experimental science demands repeatability of results but many experiments are not due to fraud or error. The list of papers whose results were later retracted or discredited, thus leading to invalid science is growing. Some errors are introduced when the experimenter's desire for a certain result unconsciously influences selection of data (a problem which is possible to avoid in some cases with double-blind protocols). There have also been cases of deliberate scientific misconduct.

Famous experimental errors
N-rays (1903)
A reported faint visual effect that experimenters could still "see" even when the supposed causative element in their apparatus had been secretly disconnected.

Claimed experimental disproof of special relativity (1906)
Published in Annalen der Physik and said to be the first journal paper to cite Einstein's 1905 electrodynamics paper. Walter Kaufmann – stated that his results were not compatible with special relativity. According to Gerald Holton, it took a decade for the shortcomings of Kaufmann's test to be realised: during this time, critics of special relativity were able to claim that the theory was invalidated by the available experimental evidence.

Premature verification of the gravitational redshift effect (1924) 
A number of earlier experimenters claimed to have found the presence or lack of gravitational redshift, but Walter Sydney Adams's result was supposed to have settled the issue. Unfortunately the measurement and the prediction were both in error such that it initially appeared to be valid. It is no longer considered credible and there has been much debate about whether the results were fraud or that his data may have been contaminated by stray light from Sirius A. The first "reliable" confirmations of the effect appeared in the 1960s.

First reproducible synthetic diamond (1955)
Originally reported in Nature in 1955 and later. Diamond synthesis was later determined to be impossible with the apparatus. Subsequent analysis indicated that the first gemstone (used to secure further funding) was natural rather than synthetic. Artificial diamonds have since been produced.

Claimed detection of gravitational waves (1970)
In 1970 Joseph Weber, an electrical engineer turned physicist, and working with the University of Maryland, reported the detection of 311 excitations on his test equipment designed to measure gravitational waves. He utilized an apparatus consisting of two one ton aluminum bars, each a separate detector, in some configurations being hung within a vacuum chamber, or having one bar displaced to Argonne National Laboratory, near Chicago, about 1,000 kilometers away, all for further isolation. He took extreme measures to isolate the equipment from seismic and other interferences. But Weber's criteria for data analysis turned out to be ill-defined and partly subjective. By the end of the 1970s Weber's work was considered spurious as it could not be replicated by others. Still Weber is considered one of the fathers of gravitational wave detection and inspiration for other projects such as LIGO.

Oops-Leon particle (1976)
Data from Fermilab in 1976 appeared to indicate a new particle at about 6 GeV which decayed into electron-positron pairs. Subsequent data and analysis indicated that the apparent peak resulted from random noise. The name is a pun on upsilon, the proposed name for the new particle and Leon M. Lederman, the principal investigator. The illusory particle is unrelated to the Upsilon meson, discovered in 1977 by the same group.

Cold fusion (1989)

Since the announcement of Pons and Fleischmann in 1989, cold fusion has been considered to be an example of a pathological science. Two panels convened by the US Department of Energy, one in 1989 and a second in 2004, did not recommend a dedicated federal program for cold fusion research. In 2007 Nature reported that the American Chemical Society would host an invited symposium on cold fusion and low energy nuclear reactions at their national meeting for the first time in many years.

Neutrinoless double beta decay (2001)

Faster-than-light neutrino anomaly (2011)
In 2011, the OPERA experiment at CERN mistakenly measured neutrinos appearing to travel faster than the speed of light. The results were published in September, noting that further investigation into systematics would be necessary. This investigation found an improperly connected fibre optic cable and a clock oscillator ticking too fast, which together had caused an underestimate of uncertainty in the initial measurement. 

Cosmic microwave background polarization (2014)
On March 17, 2014, astrophysicists of the BICEP2 collaboration announced the detection of inflationary gravitational waves in the B-mode power spectrum, which if confirmed, would provide clear experimental evidence for the cosmological theory of inflation. However, on 19 June 2014, lowered confidence in confirming the cosmic inflation findings was reported. Eventually, the initial findings were revealed to be artifacts of interstellar dust.

Alleged scientific misconduct cases
Photon wave–particle duality using canal-ray experiments  (1926)
Emil Rupp had been considered one of the best experimenters of his time, until he was forced to admit that his notable track record was at least partly due to the fabrication of results.

Skin transplantation (1974)
 In 1970, William Summerlin, working as a clinical researcher at Stanford University, announced that he had been able to transplant skin from one unrelated person to another, avoiding the normal issues of transplant rejection. Accusations from colleagues surfaced that Summerlin had not been successful with his transplants, but instead was faking the results by using a black pen to color the skin, which was later confirmed.

Water memory (1988)
French immunologist Jacques Benveniste published a paper in Nature which seemed to support a mechanism by which homeopathy could operate. The journal editors accompanied the paper with an editorial urging readers to "suspend judgement" until the results could be replicated. Benveniste's results failed to have been replicated in subsequent double blind experiments.

Organic molecular semiconductors (~1999)

A succession of high-profile peer-reviewed papers previously published by Jan Hendrik Schön were subsequently found to have used obviously fabricated data.

Early production of element 118 (1999)
Element 118 (oganesson) was announced, and then the announcement withdrawn by Berkeley after claims of irreproducibility. The researcher involved, Victor Ninov, denies doing anything wrong.

 Sonofusion (2002)
In 2002, nuclear engineer Rusi Taleyarkhan and his collaborators claimed to have observed evidence of sonofusion or bubble fusion. An investigation in 2008 by Purdue University review board judged him guilty of research misconduct for "falsification of the research record".

See also
Academic dishonesty
List of scientific misconduct incidents
List of topics characterized as pseudoscience
Bogdanov affair

References

Academic scandals
Error
Physics experiments
Pathological science